Patrick Francis Kelleher (12 December 1891 – 19 June 1958) was an Irish hurler. At club level he played with Shamrocks and was also a member of the Cork senior hurling team.

Career

Kelleher first played hurling at club level with the Shamrocks club. He first appeared on the inter-county scene as a member of the Cork junior hurling team at various stages between 1911 and 1915. Kelleher joined the Cork senior hurling team during the team's successful 1919 Munster SHC campaign. He lined out in all except one of Cork's championship games that year, including the 1919 All-Ireland final defeat of Dublin. Kelleher won a second successive Munster SHC title the following year but ended up on the losing side in the 1920 All-Ireland final after a defeat by Dublin.

Death

Kelleher died from a heart attack at the South Infirmary on 19 June 1958, aged 66.

Honours

Cork
All-Ireland Senior Hurling Championship: 1919
Munster Senior Hurling Championship: 1919, 1920

References

1891 births
1958 deaths
Shamrock's hurlers
Cork inter-county hurlers
All-Ireland Senior Hurling Championship winners